is a railway station located in the city of Obama, Fukui, Japan, operated by West Japan Railway Company (JR West).

Lines

Station layout
The station has one side platform and one island platform connected by a footbridge. The station has a Midori no Madoguchi staffed ticket office.

Platforms

History
Obama Station opened on 10 November 1918.  With the privatization of Japanese National Railways (JNR) on 1 April 1987, the station came under the control of JR West.

Passenger statistics
In fiscal 2016, the station was used by an average of 969 passengers daily (boarding passengers only).

Surrounding area
Obama City Hall
site of Obama Castle
site of Nochiseyama Castle

See also
 List of railway stations in Japan

References

External links
 JR West - Obama Station 
 Station connection details 

Railway stations in Fukui Prefecture
Stations of West Japan Railway Company
Railway stations in Japan opened in 1918
Obama Line
Obama, Fukui